8500 may refer to: 

 The year 8500, the 9th millennium
 ATI Radeon 8500, a computer graphics card series
 NVIDIA GeForce 8500, a computer graphics card series
 A variant of the MOS 6510 CPU.

See also
 8500 series (disambiguation)